Denis Gennadyevich Nizhegorodov (born 26 July 1980) is a retired Russian race walker. Between 2008 and 2014 he held the world record over 50 km distance, with a time of 3:34:14. He competed in this event at the 2004 and 2008 Olympics and won a silver and a bronze medal, respectively.

In May 2016, Nizhegorodov became one of 14 Russian athletes implicated in doping following the retesting of urine from the 2008 Olympic Games. His sample A failed the retest, but these results were not confirmed on his sample B.

International competitions

References

External links

 

1980 births
Living people
People from Saransk
Sportspeople from Mordovia
Russian male racewalkers
Olympic male racewalkers
Olympic athletes of Russia
Olympic silver medalists for Russia
Olympic bronze medalists for Russia
Olympic silver medalists in athletics (track and field)
Olympic bronze medalists in athletics (track and field)
Athletes (track and field) at the 2004 Summer Olympics
Athletes (track and field) at the 2008 Summer Olympics
Medalists at the 2008 Summer Olympics
Medalists at the 2004 Summer Olympics
World Athletics Championships athletes for Russia
World Athletics Championships winners
World Athletics Championships medalists
World Athletics Race Walking Team Championships winners
Russian Athletics Championships winners
World record setters in athletics (track and field)